Abbey Wood is an area in southeast London, England, straddling the border between the Royal Borough of Greenwich and the London Borough of Bexley.

Toponymy
The area takes its name from Lesnes Abbey Woods, located to the east, which once belonged to the monks of Lesnes Abbey.

Development
The Abbey of St Mary and St Thomas the Martyr at Lesnes (or Lesnes Abbey) was founded in 1178 by Richard de Luci, Chief Justiciar of England. The Abbot of Lesnes Abbey was an important local landlord, and took a leading part in draining the marshland. However, this and the cost of maintaining river embankments was one of the reasons given for the Abbey's chronic financial difficulties. It never became a large community, and was closed by Cardinal Wolsey in 1525, under a licence to suppress monasteries of less than seven inmates. It was one of the first monasteries to be closed after the Dissolution of the Monasteries in 1524, and the monastic buildings were all pulled down, except for the Abbot's Lodging. Henry Cooke acquired the site in 1541 and it eventually passed to Sir John Hippersley who salvaged building materials, before selling the property to Thomas Hawes of London in 1632. It was then bequeathed to Christ's Hospital in 1633.

Abbey Wood railway station was opened in 1849, immediately to the north of the area now known as "The Village", built where Knee Hill became Harrow Manorway. Contemporary maps show Knee Hill as a minor track compared with a more major pathway through the centre of the existing woods. The Village consisted of a dozen or so cottages, and two pubs, the Abbey Arms (next to the railway station) and the Harrow Inn (demolished in 2009). The Harrow Inn which was located on the Kent side of Abbey Wood was the place where live bands would play in their hall; it was also the scene of a nightly migration as drinkers would relocate to the Abbey Arms each night, as Kentish closing times used to be 10.30pm whilst the Abbey Arms, which was in London, closed at 11 o'clock.

Abbey Wood was suggested as a site for a cemetery serving east London at a time of burial crisis in the capital. The Treasury was sceptical that Chadwick's scheme would ever be financially viable, and it was widely unpopular. Although the Metropolitan Interments Act 1850 authorised the scheme, it was abandoned in 1852.

The Royal Arsenal Co-operative Society (RACS) owned two farms on the hillside to the south of The Village; between 1900 and 1930, the RACE built the Bostall Estate. Once known as "Tin Check Island" after the Society's dividend system, and known locally as "The Co-op Estate", this has streets named after Co-operative themes (Alexander McLeod, the first secretary of the RACS, Rochdale, Robert Owen, Congress), a school and shops but, like much social housing of the period, no public houses. The housing is largely traditional of the "two-up, two-down" design, in distinctive yellow London brick, with gardens to the front and rear.

Between 1955 and 1959, the London County Council built the Abbey Estate starting with one road south of the railway and later extending on the northern side on former Royal Arsenal marshland. Predominantly conventional brick houses with gardens, at first there were no shops or pubs, later equipped with a few shops and pubs together with schools and open spaces were added. Transport was non-existent at first until one bus, the route 180 was added after the building of Eynsham bridge. The estate was first used to rehouse people from Dockhead and Peckham then London's East End. The main through-road is Eynsham Drive.

In the mid-1960s,the Greater London Council began building the first phase of Thamesmead on more ex-Royal Arsenal land, north-east of Abbey Wood station. The original railway level crossing was replaced by a flyover.

Abbey Wood has benefited from the opening of the DLR station at Woolwich Arsenal, whilst the next stage in the development of the area will be the construction of Crossrail, a development tipped to encourage the growth of local house prices by the time it was opened in Autumn 2019. Abbey Wood will be connected by The Elizabeth line, with travel times of 11 minutes to Canary Wharf and 25 minutes to Bond Street.

The Greenwich ward of Abbey Wood has a population of just over 13,000, and its rail station sees over 3 million passenger journeys a year.

Places of interest
Places of interest include the ruins of the 12th-century Lesnes Abbey and the adjacent Lesnes Abbey Woods, a Local Nature Reserve. Part of the Woods are designated as a Site of Special Scientific Interest called Abbey Wood, which has important Paleogene fossils. The ancient Bostall Woods & Heath. Bostall Woods (part of the South East London Green Chain) includes one of the few camping and caravan sites in London, which is owned and operated by The Caravan Club. The co-operative woods were also the site of the first camp for the Woodcraft Folk.

St. Michael and All Angels Parish Church  was opened in a temporary building in 1905. A permanent church, designed by Sir Arthur Blomfield, was consecrated three years later, and the original building became the church hall. The Victorian Crossness Pumping Station is another notable local attraction.

Recreational facilities and parks
Abbey Wood has a number of parks and sports areas, including Bostall Gardens (play area, tennis courts and basketball court), Bostall Heath (cricket pitch, bowling green, orienteering, football pitch) and Abbey Wood Park (play area and football pitch). It also has a women's netball team Abbey Angels. Abbey Wood Yoga offer yoga classes at St Paul's Academy, Bostall Gardens and pop-up events in and around Abbey Wood.

Notable people

Sir Charles Tilston Bright, the British electrical engineer who oversaw the laying of the first transatlantic telegraph cable in 1858, died in Abbey Wood in May 1888.

Snooker champion Steve Davis lived in Commonwealth Way, Abbey Wood and went to Alexander McLeod Primary School and Abbey Wood Secondary School. Boxer Julius Francis went to St Thomas a Becket Primary School and Abbey Wood School, and Olympic runner Jennifer Stoute also went to Abbey Wood School. Playwright Jonathan Harvey also taught there. Kate Bush attended the convent school at the top of Knee Hill. Victor Ogunwusi is the current manager of Crockenhill F.C.; he joined the club in 2018 as a player, working his way up to become the manager of the Kent League Premier side in 2022. He played for Nigeria u17 (2007), Hampton & Richmond Borough F.C., NPL FC and Crockenhill F.C. 2018/2022 season, also attending Abbey Wood School. Tinie Tempah attended St. Paul's Catholic School in Abbey Wood.

Robert Napper is one of Abbey Wood School's more infamous names. Convicted of two murders, one manslaughter, two rapes and two attempted rapes, Napper was in Abbey Wood from 1977 to 1982. He is most commonly known for his fatal attack on Rachel Nickell on Wimbledon Common in 1992 and the killing of Samantha Bisset and her four-year-old daughter Jazmine at Bisset's home in Plumstead in 1993. Napper was convicted of these crimes in December 2008, and sentenced to be held 'indefinitely' at Broadmoor Hospital.
He is also believed to be the "Green Chain Rapist", who carried out at least 70 savage attacks across south-east London over a four-year period ending in 1994.

William Morris lived at the nearby Red House, in Bexleyheath National Trust | Red House, a house which was built for him by the architect Philip Webb. Morris regularly walked to Abbey Wood station, and a plaque just off Knee Hill commemorates this association.

Stewart Cochrane, a cruise ship bandleader, jazz musician, onetime member of NWOHM band Samson and author of Chindit Special Force Burma 1944 attended DeLucy infant/primary school.

Culture

Time 106.8, a licensed local radio station that evolved from an early cable channel - Radio Thamesmead - had studios on the Abbey Wood/Plumstead borders, and closed in April 2009. Abbey Wood also hosted London's first cable TV station, Cablevision, on Plumstead High Street, near Wickham Lane.

Education

St Paul's Academy is a Roman Catholic secondary school located in the area, on the original site of the Abbey Wood comprehensive school. It was previously known as St Paul's RC Secondary School, whilst located in Wickham Lane, before converting to academy status in 2005 when it moved to the new site.

Geography
Abbey Wood borders Thamesmead to the northwest, north and northeast, Belvedere to the east and southeast, West Heath.

Transport

London Buses
Abbey Wood is served by the following London Buses routes:
 177 from Peckham to Thamesmead
 180 from Erith, Fraser Road to North Greenwich
 229 from Queen Mary's Hospital to Thamesmead
 244 from Abbey Wood to Queen Elizabeth Hospital, Woolwich
 301 from Bexleyheath Shopping Centre to Woolwich
 401 from Bexleyheath Shopping Centre to Thamesmead
 472 from North Greenwich to Abbey Wood
 469 from Queen Elizabeth Hospital to Erith
 B11 from Bexleyheath to South Thamesmead, Yarnton Way
 N1 from Thamesmead to Tottenham Court Road (night bus)

National Rail
The nearest station is Abbey Wood for Southeastern services towards Barnehurst, Crayford, Dartford, Gillingham, London Cannon Street and Charing Cross. The station  became a terminus for the south eastern branch of the Crossrail-constructed Elizabeth line on 24 May 2022.

References

External links

Districts of the Royal Borough of Greenwich
Areas of London
Districts of the London Borough of Bexley